Kagyu Samye Ling Monastery and Tibetan Centre is a Tibetan Buddhist complex associated with the Karma Kagyu school located at Eskdalemuir, Scotland.

History
Before the present Temple complex was built, Samye Ling centred on just one building, a former hunting lodge called Johnstone House. In 1965 the Johnstone House Trust was formed with the objectives
to make available to the public facilities for study and meditation based on Buddhist and other religious teaching leading to mental and spiritual well-being: and to provide guidance for those in need of such help: and in particular the utilisation of the property known as Johnstone House, Eskdalemuir, for such purposes.

Initially the community there was led there by a Canadian Theravada monk named Anandabodhi. When the community declined, Anandabodhi returned to Canada; he was subsequently ordained in the Tibetan Vajrayana tradition and enthroned as Namgyal Rinpoche by the 16th Gyalwa Karmapa.

In 1967 the Johnstone House trustees invited the Tibetan lamas and refugees Chögyam Trungpa Rinpoche and Akong Rinpoche to take over. They named the new community "Samye Ling", and were shortly joined by the thangka master-artist Sherab Palden Beru and the monk Samten. Samye refers to the first Buddhist monastic university in Tibet, while Ling means 'Place'.

Trungpa Rinpoche quickly came into conflict with both Akong Rinpoche and the trustees. He drank heavily and slept with his students. He married one of these, a fifteen-year-old girl at the time the relationship began, attracting press attention. By this time he had already been banished to a nearby house and supposedly divested by the 16th Gyalwa Karmapa of his position as an official representative of the Karma Kagyu lineage. In 1970 he left for America to form other centres definitively ending his association with Samye Ling, except for a single, brief visit at the end of the 1970s to recover his seals of office, once the Karmapa had agreed to empower him as Vidyādhara, a Holder of the Karma Kagyü Lineage.

For about the decade 1970 onwards Samten, Beru, and Akong Rinpoche together were the main resident Tibetans at the centre. They were joined during 1976 and 1977 by the Mani-pa Lama bLa mChog. During this seminal period of the 1970s, Samye Ling was the main and oldest Tibetan centre in Europe. As such, it received important visits from eminent teachers of many traditions, including first the Kalu Rinpoche (1973 and thereafter), the 16th Gyalwa Karmapa (Nov. 1975 and 12.12.-26.12.1977), Khamtrul Rinpoche, Dilgo Khyense Rinpoche and Urgyen Tulku.

In 1969, musicians David Bowie and Leonard Cohen were students at Samye Ling.
In fact Bowie not only studied Buddhism at Samye Ling, he almost became a monk there:

"I was a terribly earnest Buddhist at the time [...] I had stayed in their monastery and was going through all their exams, and yet I had this feeling that it wasn't right for me. I suddenly realised how close it all was: another month and my head would have been shaved."

The centre flourished and developed under the guidance of Akong Rinpoche and his brother  Lama Yeshe Losal Rinpoche, who serves as both Abbot and Retreat Master. The centre includes one of the first Tibetan temples to be constructed in Western Europe, a large Stupa, and accommodation for those taking a range of courses on Buddhism, meditation, spiritual development and art.

ROKPA trust

The Johnstone House Trust ceased to exist in 1995 and the centre now describes itself as part of the ROKPA trust whose objectives are
to promote Buddhism and to foster non-sectarian inter-religious dialogue and understanding. To provide medical care and therapy. To provide education. To relieve poverty.

The ROKPA trust administers a number of other centres and projects worldwide, notably the Holy Island Project which has Buddhist retreat facilities and a centre for world peace and health on Holy Island on the Firth of Clyde and its Overseas Projects on behalf of ROKPA International based in Switzerland.

A ROKPA International project based at Samye Ling to raise funds for the girls school at Kandze Monastery was successful in reaching its target of £9,449. As at 2010 the trust was actively involved in relief efforts following the Yushu earthquake.

In 2008 the total declared income of the ROKPA trust was £2,916,136. The total funds received for Overseas Projects was £294,586 of which £260,361 was disbursed to ROKPA International.

The trust is planning a further expansion of its Samye Ling temple project involving a major multimillion-pound extension which will eventually house a museum, a library, lecture theatres, offices and accommodation. Work began on this in early 2008. It lodged an amendment to the layout of this second phase with the Dumfries and Galloway Council on 18 June 2010.

Preservation of Tibetan art and crafts

Under the guidance of the Tibetan artist Sherab Palden Beru, Samye Ling has also become a centre for the creation, repair and restoration of thangkas, principally in the Karma Gadri style. Since the 1970s Sherab has trained a number of western practitioners in the highly specialised techniques needed to create thangkas. The temple walls are decorated with many examples of the work of both Sherab Palden Beru and his western pupils.

Traditional deity and monumental sculpture and the creation of prayer-wheels are also carried out at the centre under the direction of resident and visiting Tibetan experts. The grounds of the centre feature many examples of their work, such as a statue of Nagarjuna. This latter statue was sculpted by Lama Thubten Kunsal from Tashi Gonsar Gong monastery in Derge, East Tibet. On 12 October 2013 the centre announced that Thubten Kunsal has been named by Chengdu police as one of three individuals suspected of the murders of Akong Rinpoche, co-founder of the centre, and two others in Chengdu, China, on 8 October 2013.

Scottish sensibility

Listed as a tourist attraction by VisitScotland, the centre attracts visitors who come simply to see a spectacular gilded temple, stupas and gardens with statues of Bodhisattvas and Buddhas.

In its early days there was a history of uneasy relations with neighbouring residents, with disputes over planning applications and suspicion about behaviour of residents and visitors. Nevertheless, the centre has come to enjoy cordial relationships with the local community. Many of its original members are now incorporated into that community and its economy, providing much needed support for local concerns such as primary schools. Local leaders such as former MP and Liberal Party leader David Steel are warmly supportive.

In a 2003 interview with the Sri Lanka Daily News Lama Yeshe Losal Rinpoche said that the Scottish Tourist board had told him it was the 10th most visited place in Scotland:
"There seems to be something about Tibetan Buddhism which appeals to people in the West, where so many people are disillusioned with the stress and the lack of a spiritual aspect in their lives."

Popular Scottish comedian Billy Connolly often visits Samye Ling.

In 2010 Lama Yeshe Losal designed a Buddhist tartan whose colours represent the five elements in Tibetan cosmogeny:
"We are fortunate to be established as part of the Scottish community and wanted a tartan for our Sangha to show how much appreciation we have for the people, culture and tradition of Scotland".

See also

 Buddhism in Scotland
 List of monastic houses in Scotland
 Religion in Scotland

References

External links

 

Buddhist temples in Scotland
Karma Kagyu monasteries and temples
Buildings and structures in Dumfries and Galloway
Tibetan Buddhist organizations
Monasteries in Scotland
1965 establishments in Scotland
Religious organisations based in Scotland
Religious organizations established in 1965
Buddhist monasteries in the United Kingdom
Tibetan Buddhism in the United Kingdom